Winchester railway station is a railway station in Winchester in the county of Hampshire, England. It is on the South West Main Line and was known as Winchester City from 1949–67 to distinguish it from Winchester (Chesil) station.

Despite its prominence (most passenger trains stop here), the station only has two platforms. One is on the western side, with the line running in a northerly direction via Basingstoke, Woking and Clapham Junction, towards the terminal at Waterloo.

History
The station was opened on 10 June 1839 by the London and Southampton Railway (later the London and South Western Railway). It became a temporary terminus for the Winchester to Southampton section. On the same day, another station was opened at Basingstoke, which was a temporary terminus of the London to Basingstoke section.

The following year, a line was built joining Winchester and Basingstoke and the line was complete. Winchester became a through station on 30 March 1840.

As the line bypassed Kingston upon Thames, Winchester was the only major settlement on the line between London and Southampton. Since the original Southampton line ran via the then small market town of Basingstoke (where lines to the west would be built), it was not very direct. Another line was constructed to run via Guildford, Farnham and Alton, which joined the main line north of Winchester. The present day line runs via Aldershot instead of Guildford, and the line finishes at Alton. British Rail closed the line from Alton to Winchester in 1973 but a section from Alton to Alresford is preserved as the Watercress Line. The final gap from Alresford to Winchester is unlikely ever to be reinstated owing to housing having been built on the trackbed.

Later, the Great Western Railway built the Didcot, Newbury and Southampton Railway. This passed at a separate station on the eastern side of Winchester, when opened called Winchester Cheesehill, later . In 1949, it was renamed Winchester Chesil, whilst Winchester's main station was renamed Winchester City. This did not last long: In 1966 Chesil closed and an alternative diversionary route to Oxford, Birmingham and beyond, bypassing Basingstoke and Reading, was consequently lost. The following year British Rail changed the station name from Winchester City to Winchester.

Renovations in summer 2004 gave the western side a refurbished entrance and second ticket office; albeit with shorter opening hours than that on the eastern side.

In summer 2009, both platforms received ticket barriers with CCTV, with the entrance to platform 2 from the forecourt reorganised as part of South West Trains' plan to fit or refit ticket barriers on the busiest stations on the network.

In July 2013, A brand new footbridge was constructed between the platforms and also features lifts.

Accidents and incidents
In 1937, a boat train caught fire due to an electrical defect in one of the carriages. Four carriages were destroyed.

Goods yard and motive power depot
A small engine shed was built by the Southern Railway in 1927. This housed a shunting locomotive which worked in the local goods yard. It was closed, together with the goods yard, in 1963. There were formerly extensive sidings on both sides of the station and a coal yard, all now largely converted to car parks. On the eastern side, in the area now occupied by retail units, there was a cattle dock for livestock arriving by rail for the adjacent Winchester Cattle Market in Andover Road.

Services

South Western Railway provide regular and frequent services to and from London Waterloo, with the fastest taking 61 minutes. Southbound, there is one train per hour to Weymouth, one to Portsmouth Harbour and an additional stopping service to Poole each hour (Mon-Sat).

There was a rail-bus link operated on behalf of South West Trains. This was known as the Romsey Rail-Link service and followed the same route as the X66, linking the station with Romsey via Hursley and Ampfield but with limited stops. Guards were equipped with rail ticket machines and were able to issue tickets for the entire rail network as well as weekly season tickets, thereby saving passengers the necessity of queuing at the station ticket office. The service ceased on 28 July 2008 when South West Trains withdrew its subsidy, citing lack of use, despite a protest group having formed and collecting a petition of over 1,000 signatures to oppose the closure.
As part of the superseded X66 timetable, Stagecoach continue to operate two of the early morning peak services which were well used alongside the existing hourly services (now half-hourly on weekdays) but without the facility to purchase rail tickets on the buses. The route (now known simply as Route 66) has been extended with variants through the day, and increased journey times, to serve Romsey's outlying housing estates at Woodley, Cupernham and Abbotswood.

References

External links

 History of the Line
 Winchester Local Guide

Railway stations in Hampshire
DfT Category C1 stations
Railway Station
Railway stations in Great Britain opened in 1839
Former London and South Western Railway stations
Railway stations served by CrossCountry
Railway stations served by South Western Railway